Long, Lamoreaux & Long was an architectural partnership in Minneapolis, Minnesota, of Franklin B. Long (1842–1912), Lowell A. Lamoreaux (December 23, 1861 – February 1, 1922), and Franklin's son Louis L. Long (c.1870-1925).

Franklin B. Long had previously partnered in Long and Kees.

A number of Lamoreaux's, Louis Long's and the firm's works are listed on the National Register of Historic Places.

Works individually by Lamoreaux, by Louis Long, or by the firm include (with attribution):
Eitel Hospital, 1367 Willow St. Minneapolis, MN (Lamoreaux, Lowell A.), NRHP-listed
Pence Automobile Company Warehouse, 301 N. P Ave. Fargo, ND (Long, Lamoreaux & Long), NRHP-listed
Red Wing City Hall, W. 4th St. Red Wing, MN (Lamoreaux, Lowell), NRHP-listed
T. B. Sheldon Memorial Auditorium, 443 W. 3rd St. Red Wing, MN (Lamoreaux, Lowell), NRHP-listed
Theodore Wirth House-Administration Building, 3954 Bryant Ave. S Minneapolis, MN (Lamoreauz, Lowell A.), NRHP-listed
Wyuka Cemetery, 3600 O St. Lincoln, NE (Lamoreaux, L.A.), NRHP-listed
Anne C. and Frank B. Semple House, 100-104 W. Franklin Ave. Minneapolis, MN (Long, Franklin B.; Long, Louis), NRHP-listed

See also
Louis L. Long (Maryland architect)

References

Defunct architecture firms based in Minnesota